The 2011 World Sprint Speed Skating Championships were a long track speed skating event held on 22 and 23 January 2011 in Thialf, Heerenveen, Netherlands.

Rules 
All participating skaters are allowed to skate the two 500 meters and one 1000 meters; 24 skaters may take part on the second 1000 meters. These 24 skaters are determined by the samalog standings after the three skated distances, and comparing these lists as follows:

 Skaters among the top 24 on both lists are qualified.
 To make up a total of 24, skaters are then added in order of their best rank on either list.

Results

Men's championships 

NQ = Not qualified for the second 1000 m (only the best 24 are qualified)DQ = Disqualified

Women's championships 

NQ = Not qualified for the second 1000 m (only the best 24 are qualified)DQ = Disqualified

References

World Sprint Speed Skating Championships, 2011
2011 World Sprint
World Sprint, 2011
World Sprint Speed Skating Championships, 2011
2011 in Dutch sport